Berekum Sports Stadium (also known as Golden City Park) is a multi-use stadium in Berekum, Bono Region.

Usage
Berekum Sports Stadium is used mostly for football matches.

Residents
The association football clubs Berekum Arsenal and Berekum Chelsea.

Stadium capacity and infrastructure

Stadium capacity
The Berekum Sports Stadium has a capacity of about five thousand and over. It is normally called the Golden City Park. It has recently undergone rehabilitation to prepare it for ongoing CAF Champions League matches. Having one of the participating teams in the CAF Champions League, Berekum Chelsea FC, the ground is set for the matches.

References
	  

Football venues in Ghana